The name Régiment du Roi (Regiment of the King/King's Regiment) was used by several Royal French Army regiments throughout the period of the Kingdom of France:

Infantry

 Régiment du Roi (1st formation [line]) -> formed on 2 January 1663, renamed as 105th Line Infantry Regiment following the Revolution in 1791
 Régiment du Roi (2nd formation [line]) -> formed in 1814 by redesignation of the 1st Line Infantry Regiment, later reverted to 105th Line following Napoleon's return on 23 March 1815
 Régiment Léger du Roi -> formed in 1814 by redesignation of the 1st Light Infantry Regiment, later reverted to 1st Lights following Napoleon's return on 23 March 1815

Cavalry

 Régiment du Roi Cavalerie -> formed 1635, renamed as 6th Cavalry Regiment following the Revolution in 1791
 Régiment de Cuirassiers du Roi -> formed in 1814 by redesignation of the 1st Cuirassier Regiment, later reverted to 1st Cuirassiers following Napoleon's return on 23 March 1815
 Régiment de Dragons du Roi -> formed in 1814 by redesignation of the 1st Dragoon Regiment, later reverted to 1st Dragoons following Napoleon's return on 23 March 1815
 Régiment de Lanciers du Roi -> formed in 1814 by redesignation of the 1st Light Cavalry Lancers Regiment, later reverted to 1st Lancers following Napoleon's return on 23 March 1815
 Régiment de Hussards du Roi -> formed in 1814 by redesignation of the 1st Hussar Regiment, later reverted to 1st Hussars following Napoleon's return on 23 March 1815
 Régiment de Chasseurs à Cheval -> formed in 1814 by redesignation of the 1st Chasseurs à Cheval Regiment, later reverted to 1st Chasseurs following Napoleon's return on 23 March 1815